Erich Wenk (12 August 1923 – 30 March 2012) was a German bass-baritone singer in opera and especially in concert.

Career 

In 1960, he sang the part of nobleman from Genova in a recording of Franz Schreker's Die Gezeichneten of the NDR, with Thomas Stewart and Evelyn Lear in leading roles, conducted by Winfried Zillig. In 1967, he recorded Georg Philipp Telemann's Pimpinone with the Bach-Collegium Stuttgart, alongside Yvonne Ciannella.

In 1967 he sang in Frank Martin's , in 1968 in Bach's Christmas Oratorio.

Wenk is regarded as a specialist for the works of Johann Sebastian Bach. He recorded Bach cantatas with Fritz Werner and Helmuth Rilling, among others. Wenk recorded Bach's Mass in B minor in 1956/59 with the Schwäbischer Singkreis Stuttgart, conducted by Hans Grischkat.

He died in Lohmar.

References

External links 
 
 
 Erich Wenk BAM (Bibliotheken, Archive, Museen)

1923 births
2012 deaths
German bass-baritones
Musicians from Königsberg
20th-century German musicians
20th-century German male musicians